Eurymenae or Eurymenai or Erymnae or Erymnai (Ὲρυμναί) was a town and polis (city-state) in Magnesia, ancient Thessaly, situated upon the Aegean Sea coast at the foot of Mount Ossa, between Rhizus and Myrae. Pliny the Elder relates that crowns thrown into a fountain at Eurymenae became stones. It was destroyed by Lyciscus in the 4th century BCE.

The site has been located at a place called Kokkino Nero.

References

Cities in ancient Greece
Ancient Magnesia
Populated places in ancient Thessaly
Former populated places in Greece
Thessalian city-states